Shaun Sowerby (born ) is a South African rugby union player and went to Sasolburg highschool. He is currently a forwards coach for Biarritz Rugby in the top French rugby competition, the Top 14. Prior to coaching Biarritz, he had a two-year spell coaching at Montpellier Hérault, having finished his playing career at the Stade Ernest-Wallon for Stade Toulousain. Before that he turned out for Stade Français Paris, who he moved to from the Sharks in South Africa.

His usual position was as a number 8. Sowerby also captained the Sharks in South Africa for a year in 2003 which was their 2nd worst finish in Super Rugby history. He also played for the South African national team, Springboks, making his debut against Samoa. He has also won the French championship in the 2007–08 season with his club Toulouse. In 2010, he won the Heineken Cup, also with Toulouse. He moved to FC Grenoble for the start of the 2012–13 season.

At the start of 2014, Sowerby announced his intention to retire from the game at the end of the 2013–14 season.

On 30 December 2014, Sowerby joining the backroom staff as the new forwards coach for French club Montpellier.

References

External links

 ERC profile
 2rugby profile
 Lequipe profile

1978 births
Living people
South African rugby union players
South Africa international rugby union players
Rugby union number eights
Stade Français players
Stade Toulousain players
People from Vereeniging
South African people of British descent
Expatriate rugby union players in France
South African expatriate rugby union players
South African expatriate sportspeople in France
Sharks (Currie Cup) players
Sharks (rugby union) players
Rugby union players from Gauteng